The Pillage is the debut solo studio album by American rapper Cappadonna. It was released on March 24, 1998 through Razor Sharp/Epic Street. Recording sessions took place at 36 Chambers Studio in New York, except for the song "Everything Is Everything", which was recorded at Soundtrack Studios and Sony Music Studios in New York. Production was handled by Wu-Elements (True Master, Goldfinghaz, 4th Disciple, Mathematics) and the RZA, who also served as executive producer together with Ghostface Killah, Mitchell "Divine" Diggs and Oliver "Power" Grant. It features guest appearances from fellow Wu-Tang Clan members and affiliates Killa Bamz, Method Man, Ghostface Killah, Tekitha, Blue Raspberry, Raekwon, Rhyme Recca and U-God.

In the United States, the album debuted at number 3 on the Billboard 200 and topped the Top R&B/Hip-Hop Albums chart with 132,000 copies sold in its first week. In its second week, the album charted at number 16 on the Billboard 200 and sold an addition 63,000 copies. It was certified gold by the Recording Industry Association of America on April 24, 1998. It also peaked at No. 8 in Canada, No. 28 in the Netherlands, No. 36 in Finland, No. 43 in the United Kingdom, No. 58 in France and No. 67 in Germany.

The song "Run" later appeared on Bulworth – The Soundtrack.

Track listing

Sample credits
 Track 16 contains a sample of "You, I Adore" written by Anthony Sepe and Barry White and performed by The Love Unlimited Orchestra.

Personnel
Darryl "Cappadonna" Hill – vocals
Walbert "Killer Bamz" Dale – vocals (tracks: 2, 4, 15)
Lamont "U-God" Hawkins – vocals (track 5)
Clifford "Method Man" Smith – vocals (tracks: 5, 9, 12)
Dennis "Ghostface Killah" Coles – vocals (tracks: 8, 17), executive producer
Corey "Raekwon" Woods – vocals (track 12)
Candi "Blue Raspberry" Lindsey – vocals (track 13)
Thaddaeus "Rhyme Recca" Birkett – vocals (track 14)
Tekitha Washington – vocals (tracks: 15, 16)
Derek "True Master" Harris – producer (tracks: 1, 5, 7, 9, 10, 12), mixing (tracks: 1, 5, 8-10, 12)
Scott "Goldfinghaz" Kinchen – producer & mixing (tracks: 2, 14, 16)
Robert "RZA" Diggs – producer & mixing (tracks: 3, 4, 6, 13, 15, 17), executive producer, supervisor
Ronald "Allah Mathematics" Bean – producer (track 8)
Selwyn "4th Disciple" Bougard – producer & mixing (track 11)
Ted Wohlsen – mixing (tracks: 1, 7)
Nolan "Dr. No" Moffitte – mixing (tracks: 2, 14-16), engineering
Jason Groucott – engineering assistant (tracks: 1, 7)
Mitchell "Divine" Diggs – executive producer
Oliver "Power" Grant – executive producer
Ron Jaramillo – art direction, design
Daniel Hastings – photography
Jeff Trotter – A&R

Charts

Weekly charts

Year-end charts

Certifications

See also
List of Billboard number-one R&B albums of 1998

References

External links

1998 debut albums
Cappadonna albums
Epic Records albums
Albums produced by RZA
Albums produced by Mathematics
Albums produced by True Master
Albums produced by 4th Disciple